Mohammed Mahbub-ul-Islam, BSP, ndc, psc is a retired two star Admiral of Bangladesh Navy who served as Assistant Chief of Naval Staff (Logistics). Prior to this appointment, he Served as Assistant Chief of Naval Staff (Personnel) .

Career 
He promoted to the Rear Admiral rank on 16 January 2020. Before that, M Mahbub Ul Islam was the chairman of Bangladesh Inland Water Transport Authority while he was Commodore. He promoted to Commodore from Captain on 24 November 2013. Mohammed Mahbub-ul Islam has served as the Acting Chairman of Bangladesh Institute of Maritime Research and Development (BIMRAD) until retirement.

Family 
Mahbub-ul-Islam is married to Kazi Rehana Sharmin Kanta and has two daughters.

References 

Bangladeshi Navy admirals
Bangladesh Navy personnel
Bangladesh Navy
Year of birth missing (living people)
Living people